Finizio is a surname. Notable people with the surname include:

Daryl Justin Finizio (born 1977), American politician
Gino Finizio (born 1941), Italian designer and architect

Italian-language surnames